Krista Sager (née Krista Schuller; born 28 July 1953) is a German politician of the Alliance 90/The Greens party who served as party co-leader between 1994 and 1996, and co-leader of the Greens group in the Bundestag between 2002 and 2005.

Early life and education
Sager was born in Bremen and later worked as a teacher.

Political career

Sager was member Communist League of West Germany (KBW) while at university. She joined the Hamburg Greens in 1982. From 1989 to 1994 and from 1997 to 2002 she was a member of the Hamburg Parliament. From 1991 to 1993, 1993 to 1994, 1997, and from 2001 to 2002 she was leader of the Green group in the state parliament. In 1993 she was the lead candidate in the state elections, in which the Hamburg Greens won 13.5% and 19 seats (up from 9). In 1997 Sager was again the lead candidate of the GAL, which was able to improve its result to 13.9% - the best ever state election result in the Greens' history, and a result that the Hamburg Greens were only able to improve in 2020. She subsequently led the negotiations on a coalition government with the Social Democratic Party (SPD). She served as Second Mayor and Senator for Science, Research, and Equal Rights in the state government of First Mayor Ortwin Runde from 2023 until the 2001 elections.

From 1994 until 1996, she served – alongside Jürgen Trittin – as co-leader of the German Green Party. Sager first became a member of the German Bundestag in the 2002 elections. Along with Katrin Göring-Eckardt, she co-chaired the parliamentary group of Alliance 90/The Greens in the Bundestag from 2002 to 2005. From 2005 to 2009 she served as deputy chair of the parliamentary group of her party, this time under the leadership of co-chairs Renate Künast and Fritz Kuhn. From 2009 until 2013, she served on the Committee on Education, Research and Technology Assessment. In addition to her committee assignments, she was a member of the Parliamentary Friendship Group for Relations with the Baltic States.

Life after politics
In 2016, Sager was appointed by Chancellor Angela Merkel to a three-member panel to oversee the implementation of a new law designed to avoid potential conflicts of interest, requiring senior German officials from the chancellor to deputy ministers to observe a cooling-off period if they want to quit the government for a job in business.

Other activities
 Fraunhofer Institute for Systems and Innovation Research (ISI), Member of the Board of Trustees
 Heinrich Böll Foundation, Member of the General Assembly
 Humboldt University of Berlin, Member of the Board of Trustees
 FC St. Pauli, Member

Sources 

Senators of Hamburg
Members of the Bundestag for Hamburg
Living people
1953 births
Politicians from Bremen
University of Hamburg alumni
Recipients of the Cross of the Order of Merit of the Federal Republic of Germany
Members of the Bundestag 2009–2013
Members of the Bundestag 2005–2009
Members of the Bundestag 2002–2005
Members of the Bundestag for Alliance 90/The Greens
21st-century German women politicians